Leonard Thomas Bland (December 17, 1851 – August 19, 1906) was a Canadian politician.

Born in St. David's, Canada West, Bland was educated at the Woodstock Literary Institute and the London Commercial College. A farmer, he was Reeve of Kincardine Township, Ontario. He was elected to the House of Commons of Canada for the electoral district of Bruce North in the general elections of 1904. A Liberal-Conservative, Bland died in August 1906.

References
 
 The Canadian Parliament; biographical sketches and photo-engravures of the senators and members of the House of Commons of Canada. Being the tenth Parliament, elected November 3, 1904

1851 births
1906 deaths
Conservative Party of Canada (1867–1942) MPs
Members of the House of Commons of Canada from Ontario